A millennium site is a site selected by a Norwegian municipality or county municipality to mark the transition to the 2000s. In Norway it was decided that the counties and municipalities would choose one millennium site for each county and municipality.

County millennium sites 
The point of departure for the Ministry of Culture, which was behind the concept of the millennium sites, was that there should be a millennium site in each county, and that these should be designated by 2005. The millennium sites were also seen as connected with the centennial of the 1905 dissolution of the union between Norway and Sweden.

The goal of the county millennium sites is to contribute to taking care of edifices, institutions, cultural environments, natural areas, and so on of great historical, cultural, and environmental value and marking them in a special way. The millennium sites were to have a national cultural and environmental significance that goes beyond the individual county. This goal was to say something about what makes a place a millennium site in the county, and why it was desired to give this place that status. The guidelines for selecting the county millennium sites were determined by the Ministry of Culture, and government support was provided for the millennium sites.

It was a condition for the county millennium sites that they should have some significance for the entire nation. For example, the royal seat of Avaldsnes in Rogaland at the Nordvegen History Center marks Harald Fairhair's gathering of the smaller chiefdoms and petty kingdoms into one kingdom. The Eidsvoll 1814 Political Center in Eidsvoll in Akershus marks democratic governance in the country. Sites such as Avaldsnes, Eidsvoll, and the Petter Dass Museum in Alstahaug are county millennium sites because they have significance beyond the local community and the county where they are located. People from all parts of the country recall details from historical times that create associations of something in common transcending the individual county when such places are mentioned.

The state emphasized two main measures in its goal for the millennium sites: conservation and marking. Conservation involves setting up buildings and cultural landscapes, making improvements, and making the site easily accessible to the public. The millennium sites should also be physically marked, such as with a plaque, sculpture, or building. Other marking methods could include activities and events.

List of county millennium sites

Municipal millennium sites 
At the municipal level, the millennium sites were to be a physical manifestation the turn of the millennium and were to be chosen through a local selection process. The place could be a busy square used for trade, a promenade along a river, a well-known bridge or ferry quay, a monumental space, or a quiet place off the beaten track.

In an information circular from the Ministry of Culture from May 1999, Minister Anne Enger wrote that "the millennium sites will be a meeting place for various user groups linked to a new or existing building, facility, square, cultural environment, nature area, and so on. The funds should preferably be used to establish a new 'location', possibly upgrading an existing one beyond its usual maintenance. For those municipalities that for various reasons do not find it appropriate to establish a special millennium site, the subsidy may be used to improve public spaces in the municipality."

Financial support amounting to NOK 119,500 was given to the municipalities by the organizing company Tusenårsskiftet-Norge 2000 AS. The organizing company was a fully state-owned company whose purpose was to prepare and carry out marking the new millennium and the centenary of the dissolution of the union between Norway and Sweden in 1905.

List of municipal millennium sites

References

External links 
 County millennium sites at Tusenarssted.no
 Holmquist, Tone. 2000. Fylkenes tusenårssteder (County Millennium Sites). Kommunal-Rapport (April 6).

Norwegian culture
Cultural history of Norway